Juniata Township is the name of some places in the U.S. state of Pennsylvania:

Juniata Township, Bedford County, Pennsylvania
Juniata Township, Blair County, Pennsylvania
Juniata Township, Huntingdon County, Pennsylvania
Juniata Township, Perry County, Pennsylvania

Pennsylvania township disambiguation pages